A floating production storage and offloading (FPSO) unit is a floating vessel used by the offshore oil and gas industry for the production and processing of hydrocarbons, and for the storage of oil. An FPSO vessel is designed to receive hydrocarbons produced by itself or from nearby platforms or subsea template, process them, and store oil until it can be offloaded onto a tanker or, less frequently, transported through a pipeline. FPSOs are preferred in frontier offshore regions as they are easy to install, and do not require a local pipeline infrastructure to export oil. FPSOs can be a conversion of an oil tanker (like the Seawise Giant) or can be a vessel built specially for the application. A vessel used only to store oil (without processing it) is referred to as a floating storage and offloading (FSO) vessel.

The first of a related type, floating liquefied natural gas vessels, went into service in 2016.

Types 
FPSOs are classified into the following types.

 Floating storage and offloading (FSO)
 Floating production storage and offloading (FPSO)
 Floating drilling production storage and offloading (FDPSO)
 Floating storage regasification unit (FSRU)

A floating storage and offloading unit (FSO) is essentially a FPSO without the capability for oil or gas processing. Most FSOs are converted single hull supertankers. An example is Knock Nevis, ex Seawise Giant, which for many years was the world's largest ship. It was converted into an FSO for offshore use before being scrapped.

At the other end of the LNG logistics chain, where the natural gas is brought back to ambient temperature and pressure, a specially modified ship may also be used as a floating storage and regasification unit (FSRU). A LNG floating storage and regasification unit receives liquefied natural gas (LNG) from offloading LNG carriers, and the onboard regasification system provides natural gas exported to shore through risers and pipelines. , there are 33 FSRUs in the world, of which some relocate to higher-priced areas.

History 
Oil has been produced from offshore locations since the late 1940s. Originally, all oil platforms sat on the seabed, but as exploration moved to deeper waters and more distant locations in the 1970s, floating production systems came to be used.

The first oil FPSO was built in 1977 on the Shell Castellon field, located in the Spanish Mediterranean. Today, over 270 vessels are deployed worldwide as oil FPSOs.

On July 29, 2009, Shell and Samsung announced an agreement to build up to 10 LNG FPSOs, at the same Samsung Yard. Flex LNG appeared to construct smaller units.

On May 20, 2011, Royal Dutch Shell announced the planned development of a 488 m long and 74 m wide floating liquefied natural gas facility (FLNG), called Prelude, which is to be situated 200 km off the coast of Western Australia and is due for completion in around 2016. It will be the largest vessel ever built. Royal Dutch Shell (2013), LNG FPSO (Liquefied Natural Gas Floating production Storage and Offloading), Samsung Heavy Industries at a cost of $12 Billion.

In June 2012, Petronas made a contract of procurement engineering, construction, installation and commissioning, with the Technip and DSME consortium, for what is expected to be the world's first floating liquefaction unit when completed in 2015. The unit is destined for the Kanowit gas field off Sarawak, Malaysia.

At the opposite (discharge and regasification) end of the LNG chain, the first ever conversion of an LNG carrier, Golar LNG owned Moss type LNG carrier into an LNG floating storage and regasification unit was carried out in 2007 by Keppel shipyard in Singapore.

Mechanisms 
Oil produced from offshore production platforms can be transported to the mainland either by pipeline or by tanker. When a tanker is chosen to transport the oil, it is necessary to accumulate oil in some form of storage tank, such that the oil tanker is not continuously occupied during oil production, and is only needed once sufficient oil has been produced to fill the tanker.

Advantages 
Floating production, storage and offloading vessels are particularly effective in remote or deep water locations, where seabed pipelines are not cost effective. FPSOs eliminate the need to lay expensive long-distance pipelines from the processing facility to an onshore terminal. This can provide an economically attractive solution for smaller oil fields, which can be exhausted in a few years and do not justify the expense of installing a pipeline.  Once the field is depleted, the FPSO can be moved to a new location.

New build FPSOs have a high initial cost (up to USD1 billion), but require limited maintenance. In addition, the ability to reposition/repurpose them means they can outlast the life of the production facility by decades. A cheaper alternative for smaller platforms is to convert an oil tanker or similar vessel at a cost below USD100 million.

Record vessels 
The FPSO operating in the deepest waters is the FPSO BW Pioneer, built and operated by BW Offshore on behalf of Petrobras Americas INC. The EPCI contract was awarded in October 2007 and production started in early 2012. The FPSO conversion was carried out at MMHE Shipyard Pasir Gudang in Malaysia, while the topsides were fabricated in modules at various international vendor locations. The FPSO has a disconnectable turret (APL) The vessel can disconnect in advance of hurricanes and reconnect with minimal down time. A contract for an FPSO to operate in even deeper waters (2,900 m) for Shell's Stones field in the US Gulf of Mexico was awarded to SBM Offshore in July 2013.

Built at a cost of over US$ 800 million by Hyundai Heavy Industries in Ulsan, Korea, it is operated by Esso Exploration Angola (ExxonMobil). Located in 1200 meters (3,940 ft) of water at Deep water block 200 statute miles (320 km) offshore from Angola, Central Africa in the Atlantic Ocean, it weighs 81,000 tonnes and is 285 meters long, 63 meters wide, and 32 meters high (935 ft by 207 ft by 105 ft).

The first FSO in the Gulf of Mexico, The FSO Ta'Kuntah, has been in operation since August 1998. The FSO, owned and operated by MODEC, is under a service agreement with PEMEX Exploration and Production. The vessel was installed as part of the Cantarell Field Development. The field is located in the Bay of Campeche, offshore Mexico's Yucatán peninsula. It is a converted ULCC tanker with a SOFEC external turret mooring system, two flexible risers connected in a lazy-S configuration between the turret and a pipeline end manifold (PLEM) on the seabed, and an offloading system that allows up to two tankers at a time to moor and load, in tandem or side by side. The FSO is designed to handle  with no allowance for downtime.

The Skarv FPSO, developed and engineered by Aker Solutions for BP Norge, is one of the most advanced and largest FPSO deployed in the Norwegian Sea, offshore Mid Norway. Skarv is a gas condensate and oil field development. The development ties in five sub-sea templates, and the FPSO has capacity to include several smaller wells nearby in the future. An 80 km gas export pipe ties into Åsgard transport system. Aker Solutions (formerly Aker Kvaerner) developed the front-end design for the floating production facility as well as the overall system design for the field and preparation for procurement and project management of the total field development. The hull is an Aker Solutions proprietary "Tentech975" design. BP also selected Aker Solutions to perform the detail engineering, procurement and construction management assistance (EPcma) for the Skarv field development. The EPcma contract covers detail engineering and procurement work for the FPSO topsides as well as construction management assistance to BP including hull and topside facilities. The production started in field in August 2011. BP awarded the contract for fabrication of the Skarv FPSO hull to Samsung Heavy Industries in South Korea and the Turret contract to SBM. The FPSO has a length of 292 m, beam of 50.6 m and is 29 m deep, accommodates about 100 people in single cabins. The hull is delivered in January 2010.

References

External links

 VIDEO: Maersk Oil Gryphon FPSO – The Recovery Story
FPSO Seillean  FPSO Seillean - the World's first DP production vessel - BP SWOPS
Auld Alliance Trading FPSO Services FPSO Services - Auld Alliance FPSO production services

Floating Production, Storage and Offloading (FPSO) Installations at the United Kingdom Offshore Operators Association
FPSO's FAQ's at the United Kingdom Offshore Operators Association
FPSOs at the U.S. Department of the Interior's Minerals Management Service - Gulf of Mexico OCS Region
FPSO pages at Offshore-Technology
"Skarv FPSO
Kizomba
Petrojarl 1
Terra Nova
White Rose
FPSO pages at Ship-Technology
Anasuria
Bonga
Ramform Banff
Searose
2010 Worldwide Survey of FPSO Vessels by Mustang Engineering for Offshore Magazine

Petroleum production
Oil storage
Ship types
 
Offshore engineering